John Wells (born September 28, 1772) was a merchant and political figure in Nova Scotia. He represented King's County from 1806 to 1818 and the Cornwallis Township from 1820 to 1826 in the Nova Scotia House of Assembly.

He was the son of Judah Wells and Eleanor Simpson. Wells married Prudence Eaton in 1793. Wells was also a justice of the peace.

References 
 Eaton, AWH The History of King's County (1910)

1772 births
Year of death missing
19th-century deaths
Nova Scotia pre-Confederation MLAs